Paraptila biserrata is a species of moth of the family Tortricidae. It is found in Costa Rica.

The length of the forewings is about 5 mm. The ground colour of the forewings is dark brown with red-brown scales in the basal area, followed by a tan band. There is also a dark brown band and a silver-white, hook-shaped patch. The hindwings are light grey brown.

References

Moths described in 1991
Euliini